The Dana-Palmer House is an historic house in Cambridge, Massachusetts.  The two-story wood-frame house was built in 1822, and is basically Federal in its styling, although it has a Greek Revival porch.  The house was built on land belonging to the Dana family, and was occupied by Richard Henry Dana, Sr. among others, before its acquisition by Harvard University in 1835.  From 1839 to 1843 the building was used as Harvard's first astronomical observatory, before being converted for use as a residence for its professors. One of its residents of long tenure was George Herbert Palmer, who lived there for nearly forty years.  In 1947 the house was moved to its present location, and alterations made for its astronomical uses were reversed.

The house was listed on the National Register of Historic Places in 1986.

See also
National Register of Historic Places listings in Cambridge, Massachusetts

References

Houses completed in 1822
Houses on the National Register of Historic Places in Cambridge, Massachusetts
Harvard University buildings
Harvard Square
1822 establishments in Massachusetts